Omar Ahmed Hussein is an Eritrean professional football manager.

Career
Since 2013 he coached the Eritrea national football team.

References

Year of birth missing (living people)
Living people
Eritrean football managers
Eritrea national football team managers
Place of birth missing (living people)